Litaneutria is a genus of ground mantises in the family Amelidae found in North America.

Species 

 Litaneutria baccina Anderson, 2021
 Litaneutria chaparrali Anderson, 2021
 Litaneutria emarginata Anderson, 2018
 Litaneutria littoralis Anderson, 2021
 Litaneutria minor (Scudder, 1872)
 Litaneutria obscura Scudder, 1896
 Litaneutria ocularis Saussure, 1892
 Litaneutria pacifica Scudder, 1896
 Litaneutria scopulosa Anderson, 2021
 Litaneutria skinneri Rehn, 1907
 Litaneutria superna Anderson, 2021
 †Litaneutria pilosuspedes Terriquez et al. 2022

See also
List of mantis genera and species

References
Anderson, K. (2021): Revision of the Nearctic Genus Litaneutria Saussure, 1892. Soothsayer, Journal of Mantodea Research. 2 (1): 3-85. doi: 10.5281/zenodo.5523351

 
Amelidae